Jarkar Gamlin is an Indian politician from the state of Arunachal Pradesh.

Taram was elected unopposed from Along East seat in the 2014 Arunachal Pradesh Legislative Assembly election, standing as a People's Party of Arunachal candidate.

See also
Arunachal Pradesh Legislative Assembly

References

External links
Jarkar Gamlin profile
MyNeta Profile
Janpratinidhi Profile 

Indian National Congress politicians
Living people
People's Party of Arunachal politicians
Arunachal Pradesh MLAs 2014–2019
Year of birth missing (living people)